Anneli Andelén (born 21 June 1968) is a Swedish former association football forward who won 88 caps for the Sweden women's national football team, scoring 37 goals. She represented Sweden at the FIFA Women's World Cup in 1991 and 1995. Andelén also played professional club football in Japan with Suzuyo Shimizu F.C. Lovely Ladies.

Club career
Andelén joined Öxabäcks IF as a 15-year-old in 1983 and won the league title in her first season. She was Damallsvenskan top goalscorer on three consecutive occasions (1992, 1993 and 1994). Andelén played in seven consecutive Svenska Cupen finals with the club, who became known as Öxabäck/Marks IF in 1991. In August 1994 she scored all six goals in Öxabäck/Marks IF's 6–1 destruction of Gideonsberg.

In 1997, while playing for Suzuyo Shimizu F.C. Lovely Ladies, Andelén was L. League top goalscorer with 19 goals and was named in the league all-star team.

International career
Andelén made her senior Sweden debut on 22 August 1985, a 5–0 win over Norway in Sundsvall. In 1991 Andelén's three goals helped Sweden to a third-place finish at the inaugural FIFA Women's World Cup and in 1992 she collected the Diamantbollen award for the best female footballer in the country. Her brace against Denmark in the second leg of the quarter finals of the UEFA Women's Euro 1995 qualifying campaign was the difference in overcoming a 0–2 deficit to beat Denmark 3–2 on aggregate and qualify for UEFA Women's Euro 1995. In the final of that tournament in March 1995 at Fritz-Walter-Stadion in Kaiserslautern, Andelén's late goal was not enough to stop Germany from beating Sweden 3–2. She quit the national team after featuring at the 1995 FIFA Women's World Cup, which Sweden hosted. There had been a dispute over the team's tactics at the tournament.

Matches and goals scored at World Cup tournaments 
Anneli Andelén competed in two FIFA Women's World Cups:
China 1991,
and Sweden 1995. In the 1991 edition, Andelén played every minute of the tournament and scored the opening goal in a 4–0 victory over Germany in the Third Place Match.

Matches and goals scored at European Championship tournaments 
Anneli Andelén appeared in three European Championship tournaments. Her side finished in second place at the 1987 and 1995 editions of the competition, and took home a third place finish in 1989.

Personal life
During her playing career Andelén was in a relationship with club teammate Nathalie Geeris. Andelén married Lisa in June 2008. She became chief executive of the family sawmill business after her football career.

References

Match reports

External links

Göteborg profile

Living people
1968 births
Swedish women's footballers
Sweden women's international footballers
1991 FIFA Women's World Cup players
1995 FIFA Women's World Cup players
LGBT association football players
Swedish LGBT sportspeople
BK Häcken FF players
Damallsvenskan players
Suzuyo Shimizu FC Lovely Ladies players
Nadeshiko League players
Swedish expatriate footballers
Expatriate women's footballers in Japan
Swedish expatriate sportspeople in Japan
People from Falkenberg Municipality
Women's association football forwards
Öxabäcks IF players
21st-century Swedish LGBT people
Sportspeople from Halland County